James Goonan (26 July 1873 – 25 July 1950) was an Australian rules footballer who played with Carlton in the Victorian Football League (VFL).

His son Jimmy Goonan also played for Carlton in the 1920s.

Notes

External links 		
		
Jim Goonan's profile at Blueseum		
		
		
		
		
1873 births		
1950 deaths		
Australian rules footballers from Melbourne
Carlton Football Club players
People from North Melbourne